Anubhavam is a 1976 Indian Malayalam film, directed by I. V. Sasi and produced by Ramachandran. The film stars Sheela, Vincent, M. G. Soman and Jayabharathi in the lead roles. The film has musical score by A. T. Ummer.

Cast
 
Sheela as Valsala
Jayabharathi as Mary
Baby Sumathi as Young Mary
Vincent as Johnny 
KP Ummer as Thomas
M. G. Soman as Bosco
Bahadoor as Kuttappan
Mallika Sukumaran as Eali
Adoor Bhasi as Varkey
Sankaradi as Press owner
T. R. Omana as Johnny's mother 
T. S. Muthaiah as Priest
Janardhanan as Raju 
Kunchan as Pathrose
Meena as Reetha

Soundtrack

References

External links
 

1976 films
1970s Malayalam-language films
Films directed by I. V. Sasi